The Fifteenth Street Financial Historic District is a historic district in Washington, D.C. that was listed on the National Register of Historic Places in 2006, and modified to the Financial Historic District in 2017.  It includes works of Beaux Arts and other architecture by several architects, in 20 contributing buildings built between 1835 and 1940. This building is a linear district of monumental Beaux Arts Classicist commercial buildings notable both individually and as an extraordinarily cohesive ensemble.

It includes several separately NRHP-listed properties: American Security and Trust Company Building, Chase's Theater and Riggs Building, Hotel Washington, National Metropolitan Bank Building, National Savings and Trust Company, Riggs National Bank, Rhodes' Tavern, U.S. Treasury Building, and the W. B. Hibbs and Company Building.  Prominent contributing properties in the district include the Freedman's Bank Building, Southern Building, and Woodward Building.

References

Beaux-Arts architecture in Washington, D.C.
Historic districts on the National Register of Historic Places in Washington, D.C.